was a Japanese rice farmer who introduced the cultivation of rice in parts of southeast Texas. The community of Mykawa and Mykawa Road in Houston are named after him.

History
Mykawa graduated from what would become Hitotsubashi University. At the time it was Tokyo's number one commercial college. In 1903 Mykawa first came to the United States as a naval officer representing Japan at the World's Fair in St. Louis, Missouri. While on his way to return to Japan, Mykawa passed through Houston and decided that the land around the city was perfect for rice cultivation. Mykawa settled in Erin Station, an unincorporated community in Harris County, Texas, and established a rice farm there. Mykawa, after the World's Fair, had organized a rice farming project, and returned to Texas in 1906 with four other men. Mykawa introduced rice growing in the Erin Station area.

On April 24, 1906 Mykawa died after he fell underneath one of his pieces of agricultural equipment. The Santa Fe Railroad Company renamed Erin Station to Mykawa in his honor, and Japanese immigrants to Texas perceived it as friendly towards Asian Americans because of the renaming. A school established there, Mykawa School, and Mykawa Road were named in his honor. Mykawa's name, as the town name and the name of Mykawa Road, is pronounced differently from the actual Japanese name Maekawa. The spelling of his family name was stated by a friend living in Texas as "Mykawa", and the friend had given the railroad station that name.

As of 2008 Mykawa is an area within the city of Houston.

Mykawa's grave is located in the Hollywood Cemetery in Houston. During World War II, the cemetery placed his gravestone in for safekeeping for a period after threats against the grave were telephoned.

Gallery

See also

 History of the Japanese in Houston
 Kichimatsu Kishi
 Sadatsuchi Uchida

References

Further reading
. Shinpei Mykawa is mentioned on p. 144.
  奥泉栄三郎『在米日本人研究の栞 第9号』(Archive)文生書院ウェブサイト – 前川の事績を伝聞で知る日系移民女性の証言を収録。

External links
 Publications of Early Japanese in North America (Japanese)

Japanese farmers
1906 deaths
1874 births
Hitotsubashi University alumni
People from Houston
People from Aichi Prefecture
Japanese emigrants to the United States
American farmers of Japanese descent
American farmers